SASL may refer to:

Computing
 Simple Authentication and Security Layer, a framework for authentication and data security in Internet protocols
 SASL (programming language), a non-strict functional programming language developed by David Turner in 1976
 System Application Support Libraries, an application of the Erlang programming language

Other uses
 South African Sign Language, a sign language in South Africa
 Solitaire Advanced Squad Leader, a single-player variant of the World War II board wargame Advanced Squad Leader
 South African Soccer League, a former association football league based in South Africa